24th Regiment Massachusetts Volunteer Infantry was an infantry regiment in the Union army during the American Civil War. It was organized around September-December 1861 at Camp Massasoit in Readville, under Col. Thomas G. Stevenson. The regiment served with the Coast Division commanded by Maj. Gen. Ambrose Burnside. The Coast Division was deployed in January 1862 for operations on the coast of North Carolina, and participated in the Battle of Roanoke Island and the Battle of New Bern among other engagements.

Commanders
Colonel Francis A. Osborn

Service
On December 9, the regiment left Massachusetts for Annapolis, Maryland and was part of Foster's Brigade, itself a part of Burnside's Expeditionary Corps. The regiment took part in the Battle of Roanoke Island on February 8, 1862, and the Battle of New Bern on March 14.

See also 

Massachusetts in the Civil War
List of Massachusetts Civil War units
 Roe, Alfred S. The Twenty-fourth Regiment, Massachusuetts Volunteers, 1861-1866. (1907).

References 

Units and formations of the Union Army from Massachusetts